In the run up to the 2023 Spanish general election, various organisations carry out opinion polling to gauge voting intention in Spain for a number of hypothetical scenarios during the term of the 14th Cortes Generales. Results of such polls are displayed in this article. The date range for these opinion polls is from the previous general election, held on 10 November 2019, to the present day.

Yolanda Díaz's platform

Macarena Olona's party

Ayuso and Álvarez de Toledo

Empty Spain

PP candidates

PP+Cs

Notes

References

Opinion polling for the 2023 Spanish general election